1944–45 Yorkshire Cup

The  Yorkshire Cup competition was a knock-out competition between (mainly professional) rugby league clubs from  the  county of Yorkshire. The actual area was at times increased to encompass other teams from  outside the  county such as Newcastle, Mansfield, Coventry, and even London (in the form of Acton & Willesden. The competition always took place early in the season, in the Autumn, with the final taking place in (or just before) December (The only exception to this was when disruption of the fixture list was caused during, and immediately after, the two World Wars)
The Second World War was continuing and the Yorkshire Cup remained in the early part of the  1944–45 Northern Rugby Football League Wartime Emergency League season calendar

1944–45 was the thirty-seventh occasion on which the  Yorkshire Cup competition had been held.
Halifax won the trophy by beating Hunslet in a two-legged final by an aggregate score of 14-3
Hunslet played the  first leg match at home (at Parkside, Hunslet, Leeds, now in West Yorkshire) and lost 3-12. The attendance was 11,213 and receipts were £744.
Halifax were at home (at Thrum Hall) for the  second leg match and duly won 2-0. The attendance at the  second leg match was 9,800 and receipts £745.

Change in Club participation

Hull Kingston Rovers – The club dropped out of the wartime Lancashire league after the ‘first (1939–40) season. They did not return to league competition until 1945–46 peacetime season. 
Bramley – withdrew after the  third wartime season (1941–42) had finished and did not rejoin until the 1945–46 season. 
Castleford – withdrew after the  third wartime season (1941–42) had finished and did not participate for two seasons, re-joining for this 1944–45 season. 
Hunslet – withdrew after the  third wartime season (1941–42) had finished and did not participate for one season, and re-joined in time for the 1943–44 Northern Rugby Football League Wartime Emergency League season 
Wigan - This club entered the  Yorkshire Cup competition for the fifth successive season
Oldham - The  club, as Wigan, also entered the  Yorkshire Cup competition and for the fifth successive season
St. Helens - The  club, as Wigan and Oldham, also entered the Yorkshire Cup competition and for their third successive season
Barrow – withdrew after the end of the first (1939–40) season finished and did not rejoin the  league, including the  Yorkshire Cup until the  1943–44 Northern Rugby Football League Wartime Emergency League season.
Dewsbury  - had a relatively successful time during the war years. Managed by Eddie Waring, and with the side boosted by the inclusion of a number of big-name guest players, the club won the Wartime Emergency League in 1941–42 and again the following season 1942–43  (though that championship was declared null and void when it was discovered they had played an ineligible player). They were also runners-up in the Championship in 1943–44, Challenge Cup winners in 1943 and Yorkshire Cup final appearances in this season 1940–41 and winners in 1942–43.

Background 

This season there were no junior/amateur clubs taking part, Castleford rejoined after two seasons' absence, and with the Lancashire presence with the quartet of Wigan, Oldham, St. Helens and Barrow, this increased the entries by one, bringing the total up to seventeen.

This in turn resulted in no byes in the first round, and also the addition of one fixture in a preliminary round.

For the third successive year all the ties (this season including the actual final) were played on a two-legged home and away basis.

Competition and results

Preliminary round – first leg 
Involved  1 match and 2 clubs
The preliminary round tie was played on a two-legged home and away basis

Preliminary round – second leg 
Involved  1 match and 2 clubs
All first round ties are played on a two-legged home and away basis

Round 1 – first leg 
Involved  8 matches (with no byes) and 16 clubs
All first round ties are played on a two-legged home and away basis

Round 1 – second leg  
Involved  8 matches (with no byes) and 16 clubs
All first round ties are played on a two-legged home and away basis

Round 2 – quarterfinals – first leg 
Involved 4 matches and 8 clubs
All second round ties are played on a two-legged home and away basis

Round 2 – second leg  
Involved 4 matches and 8 clubs
All second round ties are played on a two-legged home and away basis

Round 3 – semifinals – first leg  
Involved 2 matches and 4 clubs
Both semi-final ties are played on a two-legged home and away basis

Semifinal – second leg  
Involved 2 matches and 4 clubs
Both semi-final ties are played on a two-legged home and away basis

Final – first leg 
The  final was played on a two-legged home and away basis this season

Final – second leg  
The  final was played on a two-legged home and away basis this season

Teams and scorers 

Scoring - Try = three (3) points - Goal = two (2) points - Drop goal = two (2) points

The road to success 
All the ties (including the  final itself) were played on a two leg (home and away) basis.
The first club named in each of the ties played the first leg at home.
The scores shown are the aggregate score over the two legs.

Notes and comments 
1 * Parkside was the home ground of Hunslet from 1888 to 1973. The club were struggling financially when in 1971 fire destroyed the stand, greatly reducing the ground attendance capacity, the record for which stood at the 24,700 for a third round Challenge Cup match in 1924. After the fire the directors sold the ground and wound up the club.
2 * Thrum Hall was the home ground of Halifax with a final capacity of 9,832 (The attendance record of 29,153 was set on 21 March 1959 for a third round Challenge Cup tie v  Wigan). The club finally moved out in 1998 to take part ownership and ground-share with Halifax Town FC at The Shay Stadium.

See also 
1944–45 Northern Rugby Football League Wartime Emergency League season
Rugby league county cups

References

External links
Saints Heritage Society
1896–97 Northern Rugby Football Union season at wigan.rlfans.com
Hull&Proud Fixtures & Results 1896/1897
Widnes Vikings - One team, one passion Season In Review - 1896-97
The Northern Union at warringtonwolves.org

1944 in English rugby league
RFL Yorkshire Cup